The Abominable Snowmen is the mostly missing second serial of the fifth season of the British science fiction television series Doctor Who, which originally aired in six weekly parts from 30 September to 4 November 1967.

In this serial, the Second Doctor (Patrick Troughton), Jamie McCrimmon (Frazer Hines) and Victoria Waterfield (Deborah Watling) arrive in Tibet in 1935. The once gentle Yeti have turned savage and besieged a Buddhist monastery, under the orders of a higher being known as The Great Intelligence. After becoming ensnared in its plans, the crew join forces with Professor Edward Travers (Jack Watling) to stop the being and save the planet from conquest. The story is notable for the introduction of the Yeti and The Great Intelligence.

Only one of the six episodes is held in the BBC archives; five remain missing. The story was released in animated form on 5 September 2022.

Plot
The TARDIS lands in Tibet in the Himalayas, where The Second Doctor finds a dead body amid the remains of a campsite. The Doctor arrives at Detsen Monastery, where he meets Professor Edward Travers, who is attempting to find the Yeti. It appears there have been some deaths recently, but the Professor says the Yeti cannot be the culprit because of its shy nature.

Meanwhile, Jamie and Victoria find a cave, in which they discover a chamber containing a pyramid of metal spheres. Suddenly, a Yeti moves the boulder that blocked the cave. They escape and head toward the monastery.

The Doctor has been accused of controlling the Yeti and placed on trial. Jamie and Victoria convince Prof. Travers that the Doctor is no threat. The trio return to the monastery and show the sphere to the Doctor, who turns it over to the monks. Padmasambhava, the master of the monastery, instructs one of the monks, Thonmi, to release the Doctor. Shortly afterward, the Yeti attack the monastery, during which one of them is overpowered and rendered dormant. The Doctor deduces it is a robot, controlled by a missing spherical unit from its chest cavity. Padmasambhava orders all the monks to evacuate.

When the Doctor and Jamie reach the TARDIS, they find it guarded by another Yeti, but the Doctor takes out its control sphere. They head back to the monastery, where the Doctor forges an alliance with Khrisong based on the need to enable the monks to stay at the monastery. Realising the monks will not leave peacefully, Abbot Songsten opens the gates of the monastery to more Yeti.

Victoria realises Padmasambhava is the one commanding the Yeti robots. He wipes her mind of their meeting and summons more Yeti to attack. The Doctor helps Victoria recover from her trance-like state and listens to Travers, who is recovering his senses and explains about the cave and the pyramid. The Doctor pieces together the nature of the threat while Travers recalls that Songsten was in the cave too. It is clear Songsten is the link between the Yeti and the monastery. The Doctor and his friends arrive and overpower Songsten. Songsten is bound and returned to the other monks, and the violence of his manner persuades them that he is the threat to Detsen.

The Doctor, Thonmi, and Jamie destroy the equipment being used to control the robotic Yeti. Left in peace, Padmasambhava dies. With the danger over, the travellers depart. Travers accompanies them up the mountain and his belief in the real Yeti is renewed when he spots one. He charges off to investigate as the TARDIS departs.

Production

 Episode is missing

All episodes except for episode 2 are missing. Brief clips from episode 4 exclusively focusing on the Yeti also exist.

The North Wales mountain pass at Nant Ffrancon doubled as Tibet for the filming of this serial. Filming was done there from 4 to 9 September 1967. According to Jack Watling one of the actors playing the Yeti fell hundreds of feet during filming and was feared dead, but was merely inebriated and fortunately cushioned by the foam rubber inside the costume.

Cast notes
The character of Professor Travers is played by Jack Watling, the father of actress Deborah Watling, who plays Victoria. Norman Jones later played Major Baker in Doctor Who and the Silurians (1970) and Hieronymous in The Masque of Mandragora (1976). Ralpachan is played by David Baron, often said to be the playwright Harold Pinter under a stage name. Pinter has since denied this rumour. David Baron was indeed Pinter's name for the purposes of Equity, the British actors' union, but he had relinquished it by the time this serial was produced.

Commercial releases

In print

A novelisation of this serial, written by Terrance Dicks, was published by Target Books in November 1974.

Audio 
The audio soundtrack, along with additional linking narration by Frazer Hines, has been released on MP3 CD, along with The Web of Fear. A collection box entitled "Yeti Attack" contains both Yeti adventures on normal CD.

A vinyl release of the soundtrack, also with the Hines narration, was issued by Demon Records on 27 September 2019. This release has since become rare and difficult to come by.

Video 
In 1991, Episode 2 was released on VHS as part of "The Troughton Years". In 2004, that episode, along with a handful of clips gathered from other sources, were digitally restored and released on the Lost in Time DVD.

Animation 
On 23 November 2021, it was announced that the story would be released on DVD and Blu-ray, with animations of all six episodes alongside the surviving Episode Two.
It was released on 5 September 2022. Earlier that January, press reports emerged claiming that the BBC would no longer pursue animated reconstructions of serials with missing episodes due to BBC America withdrawing funding for the project. Two days after the animated version of The Abominable Snowmen released, animation director Gary Russell confirmed the claims, additionally speculating that the BBC may revitalize the effort to reanimate missing episodes after an indefinite hiatus. Russell noted a preexisting precedent with prior reconstructions, stating that "these things are cyclic."

Notes

References

External links

Photonovel of The Abominable Snowmen on the BBC website
Doctor Who Locations – The Abominable Snowmen

Target novelisation

1967 British television episodes
Doctor Who missing episodes
Second Doctor serials
Doctor Who pseudohistorical serials
Yeti in fiction
Fiction set in 1935
Doctor Who serials novelised by Terrance Dicks